Mickey's Rival is a 1936 Mickey Mouse short film. It was directed by Wilfred Jackson and produced by Walt Disney. It introduces the character of Mortimer Mouse. It was the 84th Mickey Mouse short film to be released, the fifth of that year.

Plot
Mickey Mouse is by his sentient car, getting ready for his girlfriend, Minnie, as they have a picnic together. A mouse named Mortimer, who drives a sleek sports car (who is also sentient), deliberately rushes by and stops. Mortimer Mouse is one of Minnie's old friends who is also known as the rival of Mickey Mouse. He backs up and deliberately crashes his car into Mickey's car, pushing it into a tree. He and Minnie do a dance while Mickey gets the scattered food off of himself. Mortimer starts to make fun of his short rival, making Mickey overtly jealous, frustrated, and mad. He shakes hands with Mickey, only to reveal a fake arm sleeve. He deliberately takes two of his buttons off from his shorts, much to Mickey's chagrin and annoyance- one button is hidden in Mickey's hand whilst the other button is thrown away. Mickey grumpily tries to grab Mortimer's buttons from his long trousers, but they are connected to batteries and electrocute him. Mortimer laughs at his expense, saying, "Never a dull moment!", making Mickey even more madder. Mickey's car pushes Mortimer's sports car off and tries to scare it away by rattling its engine, but Mortimer's sports car loudly honks its horn, pushing Mickey's car to hide behind a rock nearby. Afterwards, Minnie, Mortimer, and Mickey, who is still grumpy about Mortimer, are all having the picnic together. Then Mortimer sees a bull in a nearby pen and tries to impress Minnie by doing some bullfighting. He grabs the red picnic blanket, causing Mickey to dip his nose into a drink in the process, to use to fight the bull. Mickey pulls it off, then becomes a bit nervous as Minnie applauds Mortimer and asks Mickey if he is good. However, Mickey simply pouts at Minnie, breaks a teacup, calling Mortimer a "perfect scream", and storms off back to his old car.

Minnie is shocked about Mickey's jealous behavior, saying behind Mickey's back, "You're just jealous." Mickey and his car both sit next to each other, where they both kick a rock while being upset by Mortimer and his car. Meanwhile, Mortimer is still occupied with taunting the bull. His first two attempts went well, mostly by making the bull charge into the wooden fences of its pen, but when Mortimer sees the pen's gate open, and as he's about to do a third one, he immediately yelps, scared out of his wits, and runs away, and the bull ends up on the warpath against him. Mortimer drops the blanket over Minnie and flees in his sports car, leaving Minnie to deal with the bull alone, which does not go well at all (in fact, bulls will charge at anyone or anything in red). The bull then changes its warpath against Minnie, who, realizing that Mortimer's toreador routine has angered the bull, runs away with the blanket still over her and panickedly climbs up a tree. Mickey and his car notice this and, while Mickey's car hides again, Mickey manages to stop the bull, getting stuck under it in the process. Mickey bites the bull's tail, making it jump and allowing him to get out. While trying to get Minnie down from the tree, the bull charges at them again. Mickey manages to get out of the way as it rams into the tree, making Minnie fall back down before she immediately climbs back up. Mickey then fights the bull with the red blanket, only to get wrapped up in it and is unable to run fast enough to get away. He does manage to avoid the bull by grabbing a branch with his mouth, but he is forced to retreat again as the bull turns around, crawling to get away. Mickey's car suddenly sees his owner in danger and saves him by pushing the bull aside, but the bull immediately begins chasing the car. The car once again hides while the bull turns its attention back to Mickey. The car quickly saves Mickey again by biting the bull's tail and getting it to chase it using its red taillight, tiring it out. After luring the bull towards it again, it then uses its back wheels to splash mud over the bull. Meanwhile, Mickey tries to get a still frightened Minnie down from the tree, only for them to both fall. Their car catches them with the bull still in pursuit. The car then creates a cloud of dust around the bull, confusing it and allowing them to escape. While on their way home, Mickey asks Minnie if Mortimer is still funny ("So you still think that guy's funny?"). The short ends with Minnie politely denying this ("Who, Mortimer? No!") and them both shaking hands, hence resulting in the two making up.

Voice cast
 Mickey Mouse: Walt Disney
 Minnie Mouse: Marcellite Garner
 Mortimer Mouse: Sonny Dawson
 Leone Le Doux (uncredited)

Home media

VHS 

 The short was released on November 18, 1996, on Mickey's Greatest Hits.

DVD 

 The short was released on December 4, 2001, on Walt Disney Treasures: Mickey Mouse in Living Color.
 The short was released in 2004 on Disney's Mickey & Minnies Sweetheart Stories.

Blu-ray 

 The short was released on October 23, 2018, on Celebrating Mickey.

Streaming Services 

 The short was released on Disney Plus.

See also
Mickey Mouse (film series)

References

External links

1936 films
1930s color films
1936 animated films
Mickey Mouse short films
1930s Disney animated short films
Films directed by Wilfred Jackson
Films produced by Walt Disney
1930s American films